Ernst Georg Pritzel (15 May 1875 – 6 April 1946) was a German botanist.

He is known for his research in the fields of phytogeography and taxonomy. He contributed works on Lycopodiaceae, Psilotaceae and Pittosporaceae to Engler & Prantl’s "Die Natürlichen Pflanzenfamilien".

In 1900–02, with Ludwig Diels, he collected plants in South Africa, Australia and New Zealand. They published the results of their expedition (a collection of 5700 species) in the Botanische Jahrbücher in 1904–05. Their findings included 235 new species.

The fungi genus Pritzeliella was named after him by Paul Christoph Hennings in 1903 and Melaleuca pritzelii (originally Melaleuca densa var. pritzelii) by Karel Domin in 1923.

Publications 
Südwest-Australien (with Ludwig Diels) 1933 - Southwest Australia
Lycopodiaceae (with H. Potonie)
Fragmenta phytographiae Australiae occidentalis. Beiträge zur Kenntnis der Pflanzen Westaustraliens, ihrer Verbreitung und ihrer Lebens-Verhältnisse (with Ludwig Diels) 1905 - Contributions to the knowledge of Western Australian plants, their distribution and environment.

References 

20th-century German botanists
German phytogeographers
1875 births
1946 deaths
Scientists from Berlin